Diego Mateo Zapata (1664-1745) was a Spanish physician and philosopher, who in 1724, along with his compatriot Juan Muñoz y Peralta, was denounced to the Spanish Inquisition and subsequently tortured for following and promoting Judaism.

Selected works
 Verdadera apología de la Medicina racional filosófica, y debida respuesta a los entusiasmos médicos que publicó en esta corte D. José Gazola Veronense, archisoplón de las estrellas (Madrid, 1690).
  Crisis médica sobre el antimonio (1701).
  (1716).
 "Prólogo" a la traducción de Félix Palacios de Nicolás Lemery, Curso de química (1721).
 Disertación médico-teológica, que consagra a la serenísima señora princesa del Brasil (Madrid, 1733).
 Ocaso de las formas aristotélicas (1745).

References

1664 births
1745 deaths
18th-century Spanish philosophers
Commentators on Aristotle
Metaphysicians
People from Seville
Rationalists
Spanish male writers
Spanish philosophers
17th-century Spanish physicians
18th-century Spanish physicians
17th-century Spanish philosophers